The Braille pattern dots-26 is a 6-dot braille cell with the middle left and bottom right dots raised, or an 8-dot braille cell with the upper-middle left and lower-middle right dots raised. It is represented by the Unicode code point U+2822, and in Braille ASCII with the number 5.

Unified Braille

In unified international braille, the braille pattern dots-26 is used to represent an unrounded open-mid to close-mid front vowel , such as /e/, /e̞/, or /ɛ/ when multiple letters correspond to these values, a question mark, or is otherwise assigned as needed.

Table of unified braille values

Other braille

Plus dots 7 and 8

Related to Braille pattern dots-26 are Braille patterns 267, 268, and 2678, which are used in 8-dot braille systems, such as Gardner-Salinas and Luxembourgish Braille.

Related 8-dot kantenji patterns

In the Japanese kantenji braille, the standard 8-dot Braille patterns 38, 138, 348, and 1348 are the patterns related to Braille pattern dots-26, since the two additional dots of kantenji patterns 026, 267, and 0267 are placed above the base 6-dot cell, instead of below, as in standard 8-dot braille.

Kantenji using braille patterns 38, 138, 348, or 1348

This listing includes kantenji using Braille pattern dots-26 for all 6349 kanji found in JIS C 6226-1978.

  - 肉

Variants and thematic compounds

  -  selector 1 + ⺼  =  血
  -  selector 4 + ⺼  =  皿
  -  selector 5 + ⺼  =  奐
  -  selector 6 + ⺼  =  孟
  -  ⺼ + selector 2  =  臍
  -  比 + ⺼  =  互

Compounds of 肉 and ⺼

  -  よ/广 + ⺼  =  腐
  -  ろ/十 + ⺼  =  朝
  -  囗 + ⺼  =  嘲
  -  よ/广 + ろ/十 + ⺼  =  廟
  -  き/木 + ⺼  =  棚
  -  ⺼ + ろ/十  =  肋
  -  ち/竹 + ⺼  =  筋
  -  そ/馬 + ⺼  =  肖
  -  ま/石 + ⺼  =  硝
  -  む/車 + ⺼  =  蛸
  -  ⺼ + ぬ/力  =  削
  -  や/疒 + そ/馬 + ⺼  =  峭
  -  る/忄 + そ/馬 + ⺼  =  悄
  -  き/木 + そ/馬 + ⺼  =  梢
  -  の/禾 + そ/馬 + ⺼  =  稍
  -  え/訁 + そ/馬 + ⺼  =  誚
  -  は/辶 + そ/馬 + ⺼  =  趙
  -  ひ/辶 + そ/馬 + ⺼  =  逍
  -  か/金 + そ/馬 + ⺼  =  銷
  -  ち/竹 + そ/馬 + ⺼  =  霄
  -  と/戸 + そ/馬 + ⺼  =  鞘
  -  せ/食 + そ/馬 + ⺼  =  鮹
  -  と/戸 + ⺼  =  肩
  -  め/目 + ⺼  =  肴
  -  に/氵 + め/目 + ⺼  =  淆
  -  た/⽥ + ⺼  =  胃
  -  え/訁 + ⺼  =  謂
  -  れ/口 + た/⽥ + ⺼  =  喟
  -  に/氵 + た/⽥ + ⺼  =  渭
  -  む/車 + た/⽥ + ⺼  =  蝟
  -  ⺼ + 龸  =  肌
  -  ⺼ + 比  =  肘
  -  ⺼ + か/金  =  肝
  -  ⺼ + の/禾  =  股
  -  ⺼ + は/辶  =  肢
  -  ⺼ + ひ/辶  =  肥
  -  ⺼ + ほ/方  =  肪
  -  ⺼ + し/巿  =  肺
  -  ⺼ + 日  =  胆
  -  ⺼ + ⺼ + 日  =  膽
  -  ⺼ + き/木  =  背
  -  ⺼ + な/亻  =  胎
  -  ⺼ + い/糹/#2  =  胤
  -  ⺼ + と/戸  =  胴
  -  ⺼ + も/門  =  胸
  -  ⺼ + に/氵  =  脂
  -  ⺼ + ね/示  =  脇
  -  ⺼ + み/耳  =  脈
  -  ⺼ + 仁/亻  =  脊
  -  や/疒 + ⺼ + 仁/亻  =  瘠
  -  み/耳 + ⺼ + 仁/亻  =  蹐
  -  ⺼ + さ/阝  =  脚
  -  ⺼ + け/犬  =  脛
  -  ⺼ + 宿  =  脱
  -  ⺼ + ち/竹  =  脳
  -  ⺼ + ⺼ + ち/竹  =  腦
  -  ⺼ + た/⽥  =  脾
  -  ⺼ + ゑ/訁  =  腎
  -  ⺼ + う/宀/#3  =  腕
  -  ⺼ + ふ/女  =  腰
  -  ⺼ + 数  =  腸
  -  ⺼ + ⺼ + 数  =  膓
  -  ⺼ + す/発  =  腹
  -  ⺼ + 囗  =  膈
  -  ⺼ + え/訁  =  膏
  -  ⺼ + く/艹  =  膜
  -  ⺼ + 氷/氵  =  膝
  -  ⺼ + む/車  =  膠
  -  ⺼ + れ/口  =  膳
  -  ⺼ + お/頁  =  膵
  -  ⺼ + よ/广  =  膺
  -  ⺼ + こ/子  =  臀
  -  ⺼ + ま/石  =  臂
  -  ⺼ + ら/月  =  髄
  -  ⺼ + ⺼ + ら/月  =  膸
  -  ⺼ + 宿 + そ/馬  =  羸
  -  ⺼ + selector 5 + ほ/方  =  肓
  -  ⺼ + 宿 + つ/土  =  肚
  -  ⺼ + こ/子 + selector 1  =  肛
  -  ⺼ + selector 6 + 仁/亻  =  肬
  -  ⺼ + 囗 + 仁/亻  =  肭
  -  ⺼ + 宿 + ろ/十  =  肱
  -  ⺼ + ろ/十 + は/辶  =  胖
  -  ⺼ + 宿 + さ/阝  =  胙
  -  ⺼ + selector 4 + ふ/女  =  胚
  -  ⺼ + 数 + こ/子  =  胛
  -  ⺼ + selector 1 + ん/止  =  胝
  -  ⺼ + 宿 + よ/广  =  胥
  -  ⺼ + 宿 + け/犬  =  胯
  -  ⺼ + 龸 + selector 2  =  胱
  -  ⺼ + 宿 + と/戸  =  胼
  -  ⺼ + く/艹 + さ/阝  =  脆
  -  ⺼ + 氷/氵 + selector 4  =  脉
  -  ⺼ + selector 4 + ろ/十  =  脣
  -  ⺼ + 仁/亻 + ゆ/彳  =  脩
  -  ⺼ + selector 6 + ほ/方  =  脯
  -  ⺼ + た/⽥ + り/分  =  腆
  -  ⺼ + 龸 + な/亻  =  腋
  -  ⺼ + selector 4 + 火  =  腓
  -  ⺼ + う/宀/#3 + き/木  =  腔
  -  ⺼ + う/宀/#3 + ゆ/彳  =  腟
  -  ⺼ + 日 + い/糹/#2  =  腥
  -  ⺼ + 龸 + り/分  =  腫
  -  ⺼ + た/⽥ + 心  =  腮
  -  ⺼ + は/辶 + ふ/女  =  腱
  -  ⺼ + selector 3 + ゆ/彳  =  腴
  -  ⺼ + 日 + 氷/氵  =  腺
  -  ⺼ + ひ/辶 + や/疒  =  腿
  -  ⺼ + 宿 + ほ/方  =  膀
  -  ⺼ + ほ/方 + ゆ/彳  =  膂
  -  ⺼ + 宿 + て/扌  =  膊
  -  ⺼ + 囗 + へ/⺩  =  膕
  -  ⺼ + 宿 + ゆ/彳  =  膣
  -  ⺼ + ち/竹 + せ/食  =  膤
  -  ⺼ + 囗 + い/糹/#2  =  膩
  -  ⺼ + の/禾 + た/⽥  =  膰
  -  ⺼ + り/分 + え/訁  =  膾
  -  ⺼ + た/⽥ + ろ/十  =  膿
  -  ⺼ + 宿 + り/分  =  臉
  -  ⺼ + ち/竹 + の/禾  =  臑
  -  ⺼ + 囗 + け/犬  =  臙
  -  ⺼ + 宿 + た/⽥  =  臚
  -  え/訁 + 宿 + ⺼  =  臠
  -  ⺼ + 宿 + を/貝  =  贏
  -  ⺼ + 宿 + ら/月  =  髓
  -  ⺼ + し/巿 + く/艹  =  黶

Compounds of 血

  -  る/忄 + ⺼  =  恤
  -  ⺼ + そ/馬  =  衆
  -  せ/食 + ⺼ + そ/馬  =  鰥
  -  に/氵 + selector 1 + ⺼  =  洫
  -  ぬ/力 + selector 1 + ⺼  =  衂
  -  そ/馬 + selector 1 + ⺼  =  衄

Compounds of 皿

  -  つ/土 + ⺼  =  塩
  -  つ/土 + つ/土 + ⺼  =  鹽
  -  に/氵 + ⺼  =  温
  -  心 + に/氵 + ⺼  =  薀
  -  ぬ/力 + ⺼  =  盆
  -  り/分 + ⺼  =  益
  -  い/糹/#2 + ⺼  =  縊
  -  さ/阝 + ⺼  =  隘
  -  え/訁 + り/分 + ⺼  =  謚
  -  か/金 + り/分 + ⺼  =  鎰
  -  ん/止 + ⺼  =  盗
  -  ん/止 + ん/止 + ⺼  =  盜
  -  せ/食 + ⺼  =  盛
  -  日 + ⺼  =  盟
  -  す/発 + ⺼  =  監
  -  氷/氵 + ⺼  =  濫
  -  ふ/女 + ⺼  =  艦
  -  心 + ⺼  =  藍
  -  か/金 + ⺼  =  鑑
  -  か/金 + か/金 + ⺼  =  鑒
  -  な/亻 + す/発 + ⺼  =  儖
  -  き/木 + す/発 + ⺼  =  檻
  -  ち/竹 + す/発 + ⺼  =  籃
  -  い/糹/#2 + す/発 + ⺼  =  繿
  -  ね/示 + す/発 + ⺼  =  襤
  -  の/禾 + ⺼  =  盤
  -  く/艹 + ⺼  =  蘊
  -  ふ/女 + selector 4 + ⺼  =  盃
  -  る/忄 + 宿 + ⺼  =  慍
  -  き/木 + 宿 + ⺼  =  楹
  -  心 + 宿 + ⺼  =  榲
  -  や/疒 + 宿 + ⺼  =  瘟
  -  か/金 + 宿 + ⺼  =  盂
  -  ゐ/幺 + 宿 + ⺼  =  盈
  -  つ/土 + 宿 + ⺼  =  盍
  -  ⺼ + り/分 + 囗  =  盒
  -  囗 + 宿 + ⺼  =  盞
  -  に/氵 + 宿 + ⺼  =  盥
  -  ⺼ + に/氵 + 数  =  盪
  -  ⺼ + 宿 + ⺼  =  膃
  -  む/車 + 宿 + ⺼  =  蠱
  -  ね/示 + 宿 + ⺼  =  褞
  -  せ/食 + 宿 + ⺼  =  饂
  -  せ/食 + 龸 + ⺼  =  鰛
  -  せ/食 + う/宀/#3 + ⺼  =  鰮

Compounds of 奐

  -  れ/口 + ⺼  =  喚
  -  て/扌 + ⺼  =  換
  -  火 + ⺼  =  煥
  -  に/氵 + 龸 + ⺼  =  渙

Compounds of 孟

  -  け/犬 + ⺼  =  猛

Compounds of 互

  -  氷/氵 + 比 + ⺼  =  冱
  -  に/氵 + 比 + ⺼  =  沍
  -  た/⽥ + 比 + ⺼  =  疉

Other compounds

  -  し/巿 + ⺼  =  帥
  -  ⺼ + つ/土  =  爪
  -  て/扌 + ⺼ + つ/土  =  抓
  -  ひ/辶 + ⺼ + つ/土  =  爬
  -  ち/竹 + ⺼ + つ/土  =  笊

Notes

Braille patterns